The Panther 21 is a group of twenty-one Black Panther members who were arrested and accused of planned coordinated bombing and long-range rifle attacks on two police stations and an education office in New York City in 1969, who were all acquitted by a jury in May 1971, after revelations during the trial that police infiltrators played key organising roles.

Among the defendants were Afeni Shakur, Lumumba Shakur, Ali Bey Hassan, Michael Tabor, Dhoruba al-Mujahid bin Wahad, Jamal Joseph,  Abayama Katara, Baba Odinga, Joan Bird, Robert Collier, Sundiata Acoli, Lonnie Epps, Curtis Powell, Kuwasi Balagoon, Richard Harris, Lee Berry, Lee Roper, and Kwando Kinshasa (William King), and Thomas Berry.

The trial eventually collapsed and the twenty-one members were acquitted of all charges.

Accusations
Prosecutors alleged that the Panthers had planned three attacks for Friday, January 17, 1969 at 9 a.m. Police claimed that dynamite had been placed in the three locations:

At the Queens school near the forty-fourth precinct station, one Panther, nineteen-year-old Joan Bird, was arrested, while two men escaped. The men left behind a long-range rifle. Police claimed that the Panthers planned to use it to shoot at the police as they rushed out of the burning building after the explosion.

Indictments and incarceration 
On April 2, 1969 twenty-one Black Panther members were indicted. The number dropped from twenty-one to thirteen, who were arraigned before Judge Charles Marks with bail set at $100,000. The defendants could not make bail immediately and so many spent the months detained on Rikers Island. Joseph A. Phillips from the District Attorney's Office led the prosecution, with Jeffrey Weinsten as his assistant. The Panthers were charged with conspiracy to kill several police officers and to destroy a number of buildings, including four police stations, five department stores, and the Bronx Botanical Gardens.

During their incarceration, many people and organizations publicly supported the Panther 21 and raised money for their bail and legal expenses. Abbie Hoffman helped put up money to bail out one of the defendants. Various churches around New York City also helped raise money for the defendants. The composer Leonard Bernstein hosted parties raising money for the Panthers. It was one of these parties in support of the Panther 21 that Tom Wolfe wrote about in his essay "Radical Chic: That Party at Lenny's," in which he coined the term radical chic.

Two of the defendants fled to Algeria during the trial.

Trial
The District Attorney read Chairman Mao Zedong's Little Red Book and showed the court the movie The Battle of Algiers.

At the time, the eight-month trial was the longest and most expensive in New York State history.

Shakur chose to represent herself in court despite not having attended law school and despite being pregnant while on trial, facing a 300-year prison sentence. Shakur interviewed witnesses and argued in court.

One of the people Shakur cross-examined was Ralph White, one of the three suspects that actually was an undercover agent. White was someone whom she had suspected all along of being a cop, since he had been inciting others to violence. She got White to admit under oath that he and the other two agents had organized most of the unlawful activities. She also got White to admit to the court that the activism that they had done together was "powerful, inspiring, and ... beautiful". Shakur asked Mr. White if he had misrepresented the Panthers to his police bosses. He said "Yes". She asked if he had betrayed the community. He said "Yes."

She and the others in the "Panther 21" were acquitted in May 1971 after an eight-month trial. Altogether, Afeni Shakur spent two years in jail before being acquitted. At the age of 24, her son, Lesane Parish Crooks, was born on June 16, 1971. The following year, in 1972, Lesane Parish was renamed Tupac Amaru Shakur, which means "shining serpent" in Quechua. Tupac was named after Túpac Amaru II, indigenous insurgent leader of the Rebellion of Túpac Amaru II, a rebellion of the Inca against the Spanish in Peru which lasted from 1780 to 1783.

Acquittal
The Black Panther members were acquitted on May 12, 1971 of all 156 charges.

References

Black Panther Party
Black Power
Politics and race in the United States
Quantified groups of defendants